Aviation Consultants Inc. operating as ACI Jet is a privately owned global aviation services company based in San Luis Obispo, California, founded in 1998 by CEO William Borgsmiller.

History 
ACI Jet was founded in 1998 as an air charter company with a single light aircraft, the twin-engine Piper Seneca III. In 2002, ACI Jet added their first light jet to the fleet, a Cessna Citation CJ2 and has since grown to a multi-base fleet operator with 11 private jet aircraft.

In August 2014, private investor and French billionaire Olivier Leclercq invested an undisclosed sum in ACI Jet, providing staff and operations expansion. According to CEO William Borgsmiller, "Olivier provides ACI with the same depth and access to capital as many large and publicly traded companies." Leclercq's funds contribute directly to ACI Jet's Employee Flight Department, a service that allows employees to access the fleet's light aircraft.

In September 2017, ACI Jet completed remodeling their newest facility at John Wayne Airport in Santa Ana, California (SNA), which they acquired through an RFQ award. Their San Luis Obispo headquarters at the San Luis Obispo County Regional Airport is in the process of a $17M expansion, expected to be completed in early 2019.

In February 2018, Leclercq purchased three new aircraft for the fleet: two Bombardier Globals and an Embraer Phenom 300, with focus on additional international travel.

ACI Jet is planning the completion of a new facility in March 2020, that will provide the company with additional 30,000 sq. ft. of MRO hangar space and will also provide 36,00 sq. ft. of office space that will be used for the expansion of the business' flight-operations services business.

In October 2022, ACI completed the acquisition of the Van Nuys Airport-based aircraft maintenance operation.

References 

1998 establishments in California
Companies based in San Luis Obispo County, California